The equipment of the Tanzanian Army can be subdivided into infantry weapons, armoured personnel carrier and tanks.

Small arms

Armored vehicles

References 

Military of Tanzania
Tanzania